Oakley Church of England Junior School was founded in 1962 and is a junior school that serves the village of Oakley, Hampshire, England. It has multiple facilities, including an outdoor swimming pool, IT suite, copse and a school choir that regularly participates in events at the Anvil Theatre, Basingstoke . The feeder school is Cranbourne Business and Enterprise College. On January 10, 2012, the school turned 50 years old, which was celebrated by all students and teachers.

"Death Is the Only Answer"

A script for a Doctor Who mini-episode was written by students of the school as part of a Doctor Who competition (Script to Screen). Some children won the competition and had it shown on Doctor Who Confidential. The children are now the youngest people to have written a Doctor Who episode.

References

External links
 

Basingstoke and Deane
Primary schools in Hampshire
Church of England primary schools in the Diocese of Winchester
Voluntary controlled schools in England
Educational institutions established in 1962
1962 establishments in England